is an original video animation adaptation of Hirohiko Araki's manga series of the same name. Produced by A.P.P.P. (Another Push Pin Planning), it was adapted from the series' third part, Stardust Crusaders.

Plot

Set in 1987, the series follows Jotaro Kujo and his comrades who have developed mysterious powers known as Stands. Jotaro, his grandfather Joseph Joestar and their allies travel to Egypt in search of the evil and immortal vampire Dio Brando, now known solely as "DIO" to save Jotaro's mother Holly, whose Stand has awakened and threatens to consume her in 50 days. Meanwhile, DIO has commissioned a number of assassins with various types of deadly Stands to destroy them before they can reach him.

Broadcast and release
The first six episodes were originally released  by Pony Canyon on VHS and Laserdisc from 1993 to 1994, adapting the latter half of the story arc. This set of episodes begins with Jotaro Kujo and his companions in the middle of their quest to find Dio Brando, offering very little exposition to the back-story that led to the present events of the OVA.

The second series, consisting of seven episodes, were released by Klock Worx on DVD and VHS from 2000 to 2002, featuring most of the same cast, but produced with different directors and writers. These additional episodes, titled "Adventure 1" through "7", served as a prequel to the earlier-produced episodes, adapting the beginning of the story arc that featured the circumstances that led to Jotaro's quest. The earlier episodes were subsequently re-released as part of this series, but renumbered as "Adventure 8" through "13" to take into account their later chronological placement. A DVD box set featuring all 13 episodes was released on May 25, 2007, which included a soundtrack CD and a set of 31 tarot cards illustrated by Hirohiko Araki.

The series was released in North America by Super Techno Arts. It was released on six DVD volumes from 2003 to 2005, dubbed in English, with all 13 episodes also featured in chronological order.

In 2008, distribution for the Jojo's Bizarre Adventure OVA series was indefinitely suspended following the controversy over the presence of the Qur'an in Episode 6.

The same story arc was later adapted for JoJo's Bizarre Adventure: Stardust Crusaders, the second TV series which aired from 2014 to 2015.

Episode list
Episodes listed by their English dub titles and in order of their fictional chronology (Series 2 before Series 1, as used in the post-2000 releases of the episodes).

Controversy
In May 2008, both studio A.P.P.P. and Shueisha halted OVA/manga shipments of JoJo's Bizarre Adventure after a complaint had been launched against them from Egyptian Islamic fundamentalists, after noticing a scene in the OVAs that has the villain, Dio Brando, reading a book depicting pages from the Qur'an. This recall affected the English-language release of the manga as well, causing Viz Media and Shueisha to cease publication for a year. Even though the manga did not feature that specific scene, Shueisha had Araki redraw scenes that depicted characters fighting on top of, and destroying, mosques. Viz resumed publication a year later, with the eleventh volume being published on April 7, 2009.

References

External links
 

OVAs
1993 anime OVAs
2000 anime OVAs
Anime and manga controversies
OVAs based on manga
Religious controversies in animation
Anime film and television articles using incorrect naming style
Films directed by Hiroyuki Kitakubo